Bruno Ferrero, (1943 – 2006) was an Italian Communist Party politician. From 1979–1984 and 1988–1989, he served as a Member of the European Parliament (MEP).

References

1943 births
2006 deaths
People from Belluno
Italian Communist Party MEPs
MEPs for Italy 1979–1984
MEPs for Italy 1984–1989